HMS Romney was a 50-gun fourth rate ship of the line of the Royal Navy, launched at Blackwall Yard on 23 October 1694.
Commanded by Captain William Coney, Romney was wrecked on the Scilly Isles on 26 October 1707 when a disastrous navigational error sent Admiral Sir Cloudesley Shovell's fleet through dangerous reefs while on their way from Gibraltar to Portsmouth. Four ships (Romney, Association, Firebrand and Eagle) were lost, with nearly 2,000 sailors. Romney hit Bishop Rock and went down with all but one of her crew. The sole survivor was George Lawrence, who had worked as a butcher before joining the crew of Romney as quartermaster.  The Scilly naval disaster was one of the greatest maritime disasters in British history. It was largely as a result of this disaster that the Board of the Admiralty instituted a competition for a more precise method to determine longitude.

Notes

References

Lavery, Brian (2003) The Ship of the Line - Volume 1: The development of the battlefleet 1650-1850. Conway Maritime Press. .
Michael Phillips. Romney (54) (1694). Michael Phillips' Ships of the Old Navy. Retrieved 7 November 2008.

Maritime incidents in 1707
Ships of the line of the Royal Navy
Shipwrecks of the Isles of Scilly
1690s ships
Archaeology of shipwrecks
Ships built by the Blackwall Yard